Paul Gilbert (born 1966) is an American musician.

Paul Gilbert may also refer to:

 Paul Gilbert (actor) (1918–1976), American actor
 Paul Gilbert (psychologist) (born 1951), British clinical psychologist